Caroline Bishop may refer to:

 Caroline Bishop (EastEnders), a character on the British soap opera EastEnders
 Caroline Bishop (kindergarten) (1846–1929), British advocate for kindergartens